Sachdeva is a Punjabi Arora Hindu and Arora Sikh surname, from Sanskrit Satya 'true' + deva 'god, lord'.

Notable people with the surname include:

 Anuj Sachdeva
 Akhil Sachdeva
 Atul Sachdeva
 Harry Sachdeva
 Moulshree Sachdeva
 Saurabh Sachdeva
 Yogesh Sachdeva
 Tania Sachdeva

References 

Surnames
Surnames of Indian origin
Uday Sachdeva